Hugh Spencer's Feats in France is Child Ballad 158. It is Roud number 3997.

References

Child Ballads
Year of song unknown
Songwriter unknown